New Britain High School is a public high school in New Britain, Connecticut, United States, part of New Britain Public Schools. New Britain High School is one of the largest high schools in the state.

Notable alumni 

 Anita Antoinette
Steve Dalkowski
 John Emigh
 Richard Godwin
 Harry Jacunski
 Tebucky Jones
Abraham Ribicoff
George Springer
Erin Stewart
 Tom Thibodeau
Jonas Zdanys
 Kaid Algozy 
 Cameron Catlett

References

External links 
 

Buildings and structures in New Britain, Connecticut
Schools in Hartford County, Connecticut
Public high schools in Connecticut
1850 establishments in Connecticut
Educational institutions established in 1850